Derek K. Kraus (born September 1, 2001) is an American professional stock car racing driver. He competes part-time in the NASCAR Craftsman Truck Series, driving the No. 20 Chevrolet Silverado for Young's Motorsports. He has also previously competed in the ARCA Menards Series and ARCA Menards Series East and West. He won the 2019 West Series championship (when the series was known as the NASCAR K&N Pro Series West) and is also a former NASCAR Next member.

Racing career

Early years

Kraus started racing in go-karts and bandoleros. He won the GSR Kartway championship in 2012 and 2013. Kraus also competed in bandoleros at State Park Speedway in 2013 and won the track championship. In 2014, he won the State Park and state bandeleros championships. He later moved up to Midwest trucks and super late models (SLMs). He began the 2015 season by competing in seven Super Late Model races in Florida's New Smyrna Speedway. He began racing in the American Ethanol SuperTruck Series in 2015; he became the youngest driver to win a feature at Rockford Speedway at age 13. Additionally, Kraus won his first SLM race a few days before he turned fourteen. He also competed full-time in the Midwest Truck Series, he won that series' 2015 championship. In 2016, he competed in the ARCA Midwest Tour, finishing fourth in the standings and surpassing Matt Kenseth as the youngest driver to win a race in the series.

NASCAR

2017: K&N Pro Series
In January 2017, it was announced that Kraus would drive full-time in the 2017 NASCAR K&N Pro Series West for Bill McAnally Racing (BMR), driving the team's No. 19 Toyota Camry. The announcement came after Kraus tested for the team at Kern County Raceway Park earlier that year.

Kraus made his debut for BMR in a NASCAR K&N Pro Series East race at New Smyrna Speedway in February, where he finished third. He set career-best finishes in the West Series of second at Kern County, Spokane County Raceway, and Colorado National Speedway. He won the pole at Iowa Speedway, his first combination race between the K&N Pro Series East and West. Kraus led for an extended period at Meridian Speedway in Idaho and won the season's final race at Kern County for his first win, beating teammate and series champion Todd Gilliland. He also won the K&N West Rookie of the Year award in 2017.

2018: K&N contender, Truck debut

Kraus began 2018 by competing in the Winter Showdown late model race at Kern County. He won the season-opening 2018 K&N Pro Series West race at Kern County after making contact with race leader Kevin Harvick on the final restart, giving the lead to teammate Cole Rouse in the process. Kraus later passed the fellow BMR driver while both were running in lapped traffic, taking the win. Kraus then won the pole in both races at the series' doubleheader at Tucson Speedway, finishing fourth and eleventh in the first and second races respectively. In May 2018, Kraus was named to the 2018 NASCAR Next class. At Douglas County Speedway, Kraus won his third career race, leading teammate Hailie Deegan to a 1-2 finish for BMR. At Evergreen Speedway, Kraus won the pole and led a majority of the race but ran out of fuel in the closing stages of the race, losing to Derek Thorn. In the series' next race, a combination race with the NASCAR K&N Pro Series East at Gateway Motorsports Park, Kraus passed Rouse on the final restart to secure his third victory of the season. At the Las Vegas Motor Speedway Dirt Track, he led 31 laps but spun in the later stages and retired from the race, dropping to 17th in the classification order. At Meridian Speedway, Kraus led the first 189 laps before slowing to avoid a spinning lapped car in a late caution, leading to a third-place finish. For the final West race of the season, the tour returned to Kern County Raceway, and Kraus won after a late-race restart. He finished the season-long points tally in fourth, behind Thorn, Ryan Partridge and Rouse.

Kraus' racing schedule with BMR expanded in 2018 to include a foray into the NASCAR K&N Pro Series East. After finishing fourth in the season opener at New Smyrna Speedway, Kraus finished 24th in the next race at Bristol Motor Speedway. He then won the pole at New Hampshire Motor Speedway in July. It was later announced that Kraus would join DGR-Crosley for the last two East races on the calendar. In his first race with DGR, he again claimed the pole at New Hampshire. Kraus raced against Brandon McReynolds for the lead on the final restart, finishing in second. He would end the season with a third-place finish in the season finale at Dover.

On November 6, 2018, Kraus announced that he would make his NASCAR Camping World Truck Series debut at ISM Raceway that Friday, driving the No. 19 Toyota Tundra for Bill McAnally Racing. He both qualified for and finished the race in the eighth position.

2019: K&N championship, part-time in Trucks

Kraus returned to BMR for a third West season in 2019. He also planned to run some K&N East races. Kraus began 2019 by winning the New Smyrna 175 K&N East race. After finishing sixth at Bristol, Kraus was three points out of the championship points lead. Addressing his unclear K&N East schedule, Kraus commented, "If we're leading, we're going to race three." Kraus competed in the third and fourth races in South Boston, winning the second race in the doubleheader. Kraus was leading the East Series championship in July, and team owner Bill McAnally reaffirmed the team's commitment to run full-time in the East as long as Kraus was at the top of the standings. After a ninth-place finish at Watkins Glen International, Kraus and BMR were more than ten points out of the lead and subsequently withdrew from the second race at Bristol, conceding the East Series championship.

In the West Series, Kraus began the season at the Dirt Track at Las Vegas with a sixth-place finish. He qualified second and was leading the field until getting shuffled back with around 30 laps remaining. He later won both races at Tucson Speedway's doubleheader event, leading all 100 laps in the first race. At Colorado, Kraus ran up front until a broken sway bar hindered his car's performance, dropping him down to the back of the top-five. After returning to the lead, Deegan collided with him on the final lap, resulting in Kraus finishing eighth after having spun out. Before the next K&N West race at Sonoma, Kraus ran a one-off Trans-Am Series race at the California road course, a race in which he would go on to win the pole and score the overall victory. At Douglas County Speedway, Kraus won the pole and led every lap en route to the win. His next win of the season was at Meridian Speedway, where he led 100 laps after racing Jagger Jones for the victory throughout the event and colliding with him late in the race, spinning Jones out. Kraus won again by leading every lap from the pole at Kern County, his fourth straight victory at the track. Kraus' position in points enabled him to clinch the K&N West championship simply by starting the final race at ISM Raceway, where he finished third and was crowned champion of the series.

Kraus and BMR also re-upped for four Truck Series events in 2019, at Martinsville and Dover in the early portion of the season and Las Vegas and ISM in the latter portion of the season. After finishing 18th at Martinsville, he equalled his best finish for the series with an eighth at Dover. At Las Vegas, Kraus's truck had transmission problems, relegating him to a 27th-place finish. After winning the K&N West championship, BMR added a fifth Truck Series race for Kraus at Homestead-Miami Speedway.

2020–2022: Full-time in the Truck Series

On January 13, 2020, Bill McAnally Racing announced the formation of McAnally-Hilgemann Racing, a partnership with businessman and fellow Stratford native Bill Hilgemann, to field the No. 19 Tundra full-time in the Truck Series for Kraus. He began the season at Daytona International Speedway with a career-best fourth-place finish. At Darlington, Kraus nearly scored his first career win, finishing second to Ben Rhodes in an overtime finish. Kraus returned to the team in 2021, but had a new crew chief in Matt Noyce, who moved over from ThorSport Racing No. 99 truck of Ben Rhodes. His previous crew chief, Kevin Bellicourt, left McAnally to crew chief the No. 77 Spire Motorsports car in the Cup Series.

2023–present
On December 6, 2022, McAnally-Hilgemann Racing announced that Kraus would be replaced in the No. 19 truck by former ThorSport Racing driver Christian Eckes for 2023. On February 1, 2023, it was announced that Kraus would drive the Young's Motorsports No. 20 truck in the season-opener at Daytona. He could run more races for the team if sponsorship is found.

Personal life
Kraus attended Stratford High School and was on the school's wrestling team and also played football his freshman year. He graduated high school in 2020 and missed his graduation ceremony, which was rescheduled to July due to COVID-19, to race in the truck race at Kansas on the same day. After that, he moved from Wisconsin to Charlotte, North Carolina, where most NASCAR teams are based.

His father, Mark, raced super late models in the 2000s.

Motorsports career results

Career summary

NASCAR
(key) (Bold – Pole position awarded by qualifying time. Italics – Pole position earned by points standings or practice time. * – Most laps led. ** – All laps led.)

Craftsman Truck Series

 Season still in progress
 Ineligible for series points

K&N Pro Series East

ARCA Menards Series
(key) (Bold – Pole position awarded by qualifying time. Italics – Pole position earned by points standings or practice time. * – Most laps led.)

ARCA Menards Series West

References

External links

 

Racing drivers from Wisconsin
Living people
2001 births
People from Stratford, Wisconsin
NASCAR drivers
ARCA Menards Series drivers
ARCA Midwest Tour drivers